Wesoły is a surname. Notable people with the surname include:

 Marek Wesoły (born 1978), Polish former professional road cyclist
 Szczepan Wesoły (1926–2018), Polish Catholic titular archbishop and auxiliary bishop

See also
 Sloper-Wesoly House, a historic house in New Britain, Connecticut, United States